Richard Teller Crane I (May 15, 1832 – January 8, 1912) was the founder of R.T. Crane & Bro., a Chicago-based manufacturer, later Crane Co.

Biography

Richard T. Crane was born on May 15, 1832, in Paterson, New Jersey (on the Tottoway Road, near the Passaic Falls) to Timothy Botchford Crane and Maria Ryerson.

Crane was a nephew of Chicago lumber dealer Martin Ryerson. He moved to Chicago from New Jersey in 1855. Richard and his brother Charles soon formed R. T. Crane & Bro., which manufactured and sold brass goods and plumbing supplies. The new company soon won contracts to supply pipe and steam-heating equipment in large public buildings such as the Cook County courthouse and the state prison at Joliet. In 1865, R. T. Crane and Brother was incorporated and the name of the company was changed to the Northwestern Manufacturing Company. It began to manufacture a full line of industrial valves and fittings in cast iron, malleable iron and brass. By 1870, when it employed about 160 people, it was making elevators as well. After the Chicago Fire of 1871, the company decided to expand its operations. Just after the firm became Crane Bros. Manufacturing Co. in 1872, it employed as many as 700 men and boys and manufactured over $1 million worth of products per year.

In 1890, when it had sales branches in Omaha, Kansas City, Los Angeles and Philadelphia, the company changed its name to Crane Co. By this time, Crane was supplying much of the pipe used for the large central heating systems in Chicago's new skyscrapers, and it was also selling the enameled cast-iron products that were soon found in bathrooms in residences across the country.

In 1910, when Crane had begun to manufacture in a plant at Bridgeport, Connecticut, its Chicago plants employed more than 5,000 people. A large new Chicago plant on South Kedzie Avenue was built in the 1910s. During the 1920s, when Crane expanded overseas, the company was the world's leading manufacturer of valves and fittings. During the next few decades, Crane continued to employ thousands of Chicago-area residents at its Kedzie Avenue plant, and the company's annual sales rose to over US$300 million by the mid-1950s.

Contraction in Chicago
In 1959, however, the company was acquired by Thomas Mellon Evans, its first owner who was not a member of the Crane family. Evans proceeded to turn Crane into a global conglomerate that made aerospace equipment as well as plumbing supplies; the headquarters eventually moved from Chicago to Bridgeport. By the mid-1970s, Crane employed only about 1,000 people in the Chicago area. By the end of the century, Crane was doing annual sales of about $2 billion, but it was no longer a leading company in the city in which it was born.  The Crane Plumbing unit was sold off in 1990.  Crane Plumbing is now a unit of American Standard Brands.

Personal life
Crane was also a member of the famous Jekyll Island Club (aka The Millionaires Club) on Jekyll Island, Georgia.  Crane was married three times, the last at age 73 to 35-year-old Emily Hutchison.  Crane lost two nieces, Barbara and Mary Gartz, at the Iroquois Theatre fire in Chicago in 1903.  He hired fire insurance expert, engineer John Ripley Freeman to conduct a study to determine the various causes of the fire.

Death
Crane died on January 8, 1912, in Chicago, Illinois.

Legacy
Philanthropist and diplomat Charles R. Crane was one of Richard T. Crane's sons.

Actor/comedian Chevy Chase is Crane's great-great-grandson (due to Richard T. Crane's grandson, Cornelius Vanderbilt Crane having adopted his step-daughter, Chevy Chase's mother, Cathalene). Crane also has numerous great great great grandchildren living in Georgia including Sarah Crane, Hunter Crane, Tanner Crane and Cierra Crane.

His children were: Charles Richard (b.1858); Herbert Prentice (b.1861); Katharine H. (Gartz) (b.1865); May Ryerson (Russell) (b.1866); Frances Williams (Lillie) (b.1869); Emily Rockwell (Chadbourne) (b.1871); Richard Teller Crane, Jr. (b.1873). His grandson, Cornelius Vanderbilt Crane, was an explorer and philanthropist.  His grandson, Richard Teller Crane II (b.1882) was the first United States diplomat accredited to Czechoslovakia, under the Woodrow Wilson administration.

References

External links
 Crane Co. Records at the Newberry Library
Crane: 150 Years Together, 128-page PDF of a book celebrating the company's 150th anniversary. (2500 copies printed in Bloomfield, CT, 2005. See last page for authors, editors, printer, etc.)

See also
Castle Hill
Crane Beach
Crane Co.

1832 births
1912 deaths
Businesspeople from Chicago
19th-century American businesspeople